Franco Pantano (born 22 July 1960) is an Italian lightweight rower. He won a gold medal at the 1986 World Rowing Championships in Nottingham with the lightweight men's four.

References

1960 births
Living people
Italian male rowers
World Rowing Championships medalists for Italy